Berezovka is a rural locality (a village) in Klintsovsky District, Bryansk Oblast, Russia. The population was 54 as of 2010. There are 3 streets.

Geography 
Berezovka is located 19 km north of Klintsy (the district's administrative centre) by road. Peschanka is the nearest rural locality.

References 

Rural localities in Klintsovsky District